Mishti Hub is an MSME enterprise established by the Government of West Bengal to promote different types of sweets of Indian state of West Bengal. One can have sweets made by renowned manufacturers and also by traditional manufactures from different parts of Bengal, in one place, under one roof, its only one of its kind in the state of West Bengal. It is located near Gate No.3 in Eco Park, New town.

History
Mishti Hub, is another one of Chief Minister Mamata Banerjee's brain child, developed by HIDCO. The project was conceptualised by HIDCO in the year 2016 and the construction started from 2017. It was inaugurated on 5 July 2018, by State Urban Development minister Firhad Hakim. The Hub have 10 popular and prominent sweet manufacturers of Kolkata, as well as one sweet shop from districts, which will change from time to time giving the opportunity to other district shop to offer their special sweets. To maintain quality and class, all the sweet shops in the hub have an experience of 25 years or more in the sweet industry.

Contemporary times
Mishti Hub, having in total 11 shops providing varieties of new and traditional sweets from all over West Bengal will remain open from 12 noon to 9 PM.

The Sweet shops

Seasonal Sweet Shop

References

Companies based in Kolkata
Indian confectionery
2018 establishments in West Bengal
Indian companies established in 2018
Food and drink companies established in 2018